Anthony McClellan Reeve (28 August 1946 – 3 December 2016) was the senior picture restorer at the National Gallery in London. He was described by Neil MacGregor as the "supreme practitioner of his generation".

References 

National Gallery, London
Deaths from motor neuron disease
Neurological disease deaths in the United Kingdom
People from Crouch End
1946 births
2016 deaths